is a Japanese transforming robot toyline first released in 1982 by Popy, a division of Bandai, then later by Bandai proper. The franchise was marketed as Robo Machine in Europe and Machine Men in Australia. A large portion of these toys were exported to North America as part of Tonka's Gobots series, which began in 1983.

About Machine Robo
The initial assortment of Machine Robos consisted of small toy robots which transformed into vehicles, aircraft, etc., comparable in size to Matchbox cars. These early MR toys have become known as the "600 series" (being priced at ¥600 each), and were developed through ideas submitted by children, similar to the children's submissions in the Kinnikuman anime series. Larger-scale deluxe ("DX") toys were soon released, along with other non-transforming vehicles and figures.

Catalogs packaged with the toys contained stories depicting the Machine Robos as beings from the Romulus system. Romulus was collapsing in on itself, and those beings who reached Earth became Machine Robo, while some became trapped in the Casmozone and mutated into monstrous Devil Invaders. This premise would later be abandoned in favor of a new storyline originating with the first MR anime Machine Robo: Revenge of Cronos.

The "600" Era (1982–1985)
600 Series (マシンロボ 600)

Devil Invaders

Vehicles & Bases
Jet Garry
Battle Base
Combat Buggy

Power Suits
Battle Armor 5 (Courageous / Grungy)
Jet fighter and four powered suits combine into huge robot.
Land Commander 5 (Nemesis)
Tank and four powered suits combine into huge robot.

Machine Puzzler (Puzzler)

Double Machine Robo
Jetlancer
Helitanser
Tanktrancer
Drillheli
Doublejet
Sidelancer

Martial Arts Robo （格闘技ロボ）
Karate Robo
Judo Robo
Wrestler Robo
Kendo Robo
Kempo Robo
Boxer Robo

Revenge of Cronos (1986–1987)
see Machine Robo: Revenge of Cronos

Both in Japan and in the West, Machine Robo's main competition was The Transformers, whose animated series debuted in Japan in 1985. To match this, the first Machine Robo anime, Revenge of Cronos, debuted a year later in 1986.

Chara Collection
Large, non-transforming versions of main characters with swords. DX versions come with firing BB guns.
Triple Jim
Blue Jet
Rod Drill

Snapfit model kits

Soul of Chogokin (2007)
GX-39 / GX-39R Baikanfu

Battle Hackers (1987–1988)
see Machine Robo: Battle Hackers

CG Robo (1993)
In CG Robo (シージーロボ), the "CG" is short for "Change & Glow", pointing to the fact that this line of 14 figures not only transformed, but also had working lights and sounds. CG-01 to CG-05 were released in Europe with minor changes as part of the Robo Machines toyline.

Machine Robo Rescue (2003)
see Machine Robo Rescue

Mugenbine (2004–2012)
see Machine Robo Mugenbine

Present Series (2012-Present)
In 2012, Bandai launched the Machine Robo NEXT in commemoration to the franchise's 30th anniversary. In 2015, Hong Kong-based toy company Action Toys to do a revival of the original Machine Robo Toyline, in which the designs were based on their appearance in Revenge of Cronos. The first of the series was released in the same year with the second line released in 2016. A DX version of Bike Robo was released in December 2017. 2019 also saw the release of Machine Robo Duel line as part of the Minipla subline of toys, alongside the Baikanfu getting a release under the Super Minipla line.

In 2022, Bandai released the latest generation of the franchise: UNITROBORN: Machine Robo Universe. The toys are slated for release in July 2022.

Animated series
The first Machine Robo animated series was Challenge of the Gobots, which aired in the United States from 1984 to 1985. The second series was Machine Robo: Revenge of Cronos, which aired in Japan from 1986 to 1987. There were some further straight-to-video adventures released from 1988 to 1990 that featured some characters from this anime. The third series was Machine Robo: Battle Hackers, which aired in 1987. The fourth and latest animated series was Machine Robo Rescue, which aired from 2003 to 2004.

 Challenge of the Gobots
 Gobots: Battle of the Rock Lords (1986 movie)
 Machine Robo: Revenge of Cronos
 Machine Robo: Battle Hackers
 Leina Stol in Wolf Sword Legend
 Lightning Trap - Leina & Laika
 Machine Robo Rescue

References

External links
 Official Machine Robo Mugenbine Web Site
 The Rock Lords collector archives—collector's guide to the Rock Lords line, a sub-line of the GoBots
 Official Machine Robo Rescue Web Site

Super robot anime and manga
Japanese die-cast toys
Transforming toy robots
Bandai brands
Bandai Namco franchises
1980s toys
Gobots